Frederick - Volume One is a compilation album released by Flying Dog Brewery and Frederick Playlist (a branch of the Frederick News Post) on October 10, 2015. It is composed of 15 artists and bands from the Frederick Maryland local music scene. Since moving to Frederick in 2006, Flying Dog Brewery has become a large supporter of the burgeoning Frederick music scene. After the brewery hosted a yearly summer concert series on the brewery property, in 2015 the album was released at the first annual Frederick Fall Fest, a mid-size music festival presented by Flying Dog.

Track listing
 Old Indian - "Tri-Denim"
 New God - "Friends"
 J Berd - "Toast"
 Greg Bender and the Hi-Tops - "Restless"
 Silent Old Mtns - "Trenches"
 Cheshi - "To Lose"
 Heavy Lights - "Cynical"
 The Plate Scrapers - "Ancient Mysteries"
 Time Columns - "Body of Ash"
 Lizzy Silard - "Fever Dreams"
 Seanuckle - "Choke Slam"
 Big Hoax - "Big Jay"
 Kabob-O-Taj - "Weather"
 Katie Powderly - "Beneath Blue Light"
 Retro Ricole Feat. Eric French - "Far Beautiful"

Personnel
Derek Salazar (Producer)
Ryan Nicholson (Engineer)

References

2015 albums